Thomas Sunesson (12 January 1959 – 24 October 2015) was a Swedish football player.

Club career 
Sunesson began his career with Kalmar FF. He joined Djurgårdens IF in 1986. He also had a brief spell with S.C. Beira-Mar in the Portuguese Liga.

International career 
Sunesson made 12 appearances for the Sweden national football team from 1983 to 1984, including two UEFA Euro 1984 qualifying matches.

Personal life 
He died on 24 October 2015.

Career statistics

International 
International goals

References

1959 births
2015 deaths
People from Oskarshamn Municipality
Swedish footballers
Sweden international footballers
Kalmar FF players
Malmö FF players
Djurgårdens IF Fotboll players
Hammarby Fotboll players
FC Lausanne-Sport players
S.C. Beira-Mar players
IF Brommapojkarna players
Association football forwards
Sportspeople from Kalmar County